Ontology mapping may refer to:
 Ontology alignment, the process of determining correspondences between concepts in ontologies
 Semantic integration, the process of interrelating information from diverse sources
 Semantic matching, the process of mapping to exchange information in a semantically sound manner